Stefan Kopeć (January 22, 1888 – March 11, 1941) was a Polish biologist and pioneer of insect endocrinology. Kopeć was director at Puławy Agricultural Research Station. He was murdered by the Germans during World War II.

Biography
Stefan Kopeć studied at the Jagiellonian University in Kraków. He received his PhD there in 1912, and worked at Puławy Agricultural Research Station in Poland between 1915 and 1920. In 1929, he was made director of the institute. Between 1908 and 1927, Kopeć published at least 17 papers, in Polish, English and German, on insect endocrinology in various professional journals. Kopeć began his studies of the moulting of insects with Lymantria dispar from specimens caught in the wild. His subsequent scientific activities helped determine the role of the insect brain in hormone production. He was the earliest researcher to understand the importance of the insect brain, as is demonstrated by his statement in a 1917 paper: "For the normal process of metamorphosis the presence of the brain, at least up to a certain moment, is indispensable..."

Kopeć's most significant contribution was his study of neurosecretory cells in the brains of insects which secrete a crucial growth hormone, prothoracicotropic hormone (PTTH), which regulates the process of metamorphosis (ecdysteroidogenesis). He observed that nervous tissue could behave like an endocrine gland. This discovery stimulated further scientific research leading to the establishment of the field of science known as neuroendocrinology.

Kopeć's work was cut short due to his  arrest by the Gestapo in 1940 together with his daughter Maria and son Stanisław in an operation against a Polish Underground State-run secret university. He was imprisoned at the Pawiak prison in Warsaw and executed by the Germans in 1941 at Palmiry, near Warsaw, together with his son, as a reprisal for an action of the Polish resistance, as a part of the German AB-Aktion in Poland. The University of Wrocław named its annual International Conference on Arthropods the Stefan Kopeć Memorial Conference in Kopeć's honor.

Bibliography

 Experiments on the dependence of the nuptial hue on the gonads in fish Biologia Generalis, 1927

See also
entomology

References

External links

 DFG Aktualisierungsdatum 2010-11 list of publications –  Kopec et al.  [Retrieved 2011-2-19]

1888 births
1941 deaths
20th-century biologists
Jagiellonian University alumni
Polish biologists
Polish geneticists